Arthur Edwin Gardner (January 1878 – after 1900) was an English professional footballer who played in the Second Division of the Football League for Small Heath. He played as an inside forward.

Gardner was born in West Smethwick, Staffordshire, and played football for Smethwick Hall before joining Small Heath in 1898. He scored twice on his debut in a 9–0 defeat of Luton Town on 12 November 1898, and scored a further seven times in the club's next 17 games, but lost his place on the arrival of Walter Wigmore, and returned to non-league football with Oldbury Town and later with Oldbury Broadwell.

References

1878 births
Year of death missing
Sportspeople from Smethwick
English footballers
Association football inside forwards
Birmingham City F.C. players
Oldbury Town F.C. players
English Football League players
Date of birth missing
Place of death missing